The Dietrichstein tomb is a tomb of the Dietrichstein family, located in Mikulov, South Moravia. It is protected as a cultural monument of the Czech Republic. The structure was built as a copy of the Holy House of Loreto, and later the Church of St. Anne was added to the chapel.

The building contains a courtyard, grave chapel, two aisles with coffins and stairs in the south tower.

History 
In 1623, under license from the Pope, construction began on the chapel for the nearby Capuchin Monastery, established by Cardinal Franz von Dietrichstein in 1611. The sculpture of Black Madonna was placed into the chapel. Above the chapel a church consecrated to St. Anne was built by the Cardinal's successor Maximilian Dietrichstein, completed in 1656. The Dietrichsteins have been buried under the Loreto Church since the late 17th century.

The construction of the Loreto Church was carried out according to plans by Giovanni Giacomo Tencalla, the Italian architect who constructed the chateaus in Lednice and Valtice for the Liechtensteins. The stucco decoration in the former presbytery and in Náchod chapel is the work of his brother Giovanni Tencalla.

The stone facade dates from 1700. The original single-tower facade was reconstructed by Leopold Dietrichstein. It was designed by Viennese architect Johann Bernhard Fischer von Erlach in a Roman monumental Baroque style.

The building next to St. Anne΄s, joined at a right angle, was built in 1652 as a sacristy for the church and the jewellery belonging to the Loreta’s Madonna. The treasury consisted of the Madonna’s wardrobe and gold jewels. Opposite the sacristy were three Canonical houses for the canons who looked after the church. The Náchod chapel belonged to the Moravian Baron Family from Náchod who owned the estate near Mikulov. The cupola of this chapel, also in the Roman Baroque style, is all that remains of its original appearance.

On 14 September 1784 a highly destructive fire broke out in the vicinity of the Loreto Church. The entire northern part of the square burnt down, together with the Loreto Church and the Capuchin Monastery. The monastery was never rebuilt, and the Loreta Church remained a ruin until 1745. The coffins, the sculpture of Black Madonna and the Loreta treasury were salvaged and removed to the Church of St. Wenceslas in Mikulov. Later the contents of the treasury were sold at auction.

The ruin of the Loreto Church was rebuilt by Franz Joseph, Prince of Dietrichstein, in 1846 as the Dietrichstein tomb, according to plans by Austrian architect Heinrich Koch. The collapsed vault of the nave was not rebuilt, and its area became a courtyard. In the middle of the courtyard there is a sculpture of Franz Joseph by Emanuel Max, from 1859. The former presbytery became a funeral chapel with the Empire facade.

45 members of the Dietrichstein family are buried in the tomb.

References

Monuments and memorials in the Czech Republic
Buildings and structures in Mikulov
Tombs